Megalobrimus lettowvorbecki is a species of beetle in the family Cerambycidae. It was described by Richard Kriesche in 1923. It is known to be in Tanzania.

References

Endemic fauna of Tanzania
Phrissomini
Beetles described in 1923